Mark Treanor (born 1 April 1963) is a Scottish former professional footballer.

A right-back, Glasgow-born Treanor began his career with Clydebank in 1979. In nine years with the Bankies, he made 275 league appearances and scored 13 goals.

In 1988, he joined St Johnstone and went on to make 105 appearances for the Muirton Park club.

His next move, in 1992, was to Falkirk, for whom he played three games. The following year he returned to his first club, Clydebank, making fourteen appearances and scoring two goals.

In 1994, he signed for Stranraer, who would prove to be his final league club. He moved into junior football with Baillieston Juniors, where he brought his playing career to a close.

References

1962 births
Clydebank F.C. (1965) players
Falkirk F.C. players
Association football defenders
Living people
Footballers from Glasgow
Scottish Football League players
Scottish footballers
St Johnstone F.C. players
Stranraer F.C. players
Baillieston Juniors F.C. players
Scottish Junior Football Association players